JS Kunisaki (LST-4003) is the third ship of the s of the Japan Maritime Self-Defense Force (JMSDF).

Construction and career 
Kunisaki was laid down on 7 September 2000 and launched on 13 December 2001 by Hitachi Zosen Corporation, Maizuru. She was commissioned into the 1st Landing Group on 26 February 2003.

This ship was one of several in the JMSDF fleet that participated in disaster relief after the 2011 Tōhoku earthquake and tsunami. 

Kunisaki was the first-ever JMSDF ship to serve as the primary mission platform for the 2014 Pacific Partnership annual humanitarian and disaster response-focused mission. On 29 May 2014, she departed Yokosuka to participate in the 2014 Pacific Partnership 2014. She provided Vietnam, Cambodia, and the Philippines medical activities and carried out cultural exchanges. On 24 July the ship returned to Kure.

From 3 to 9 September Kunisaki participated in the ADMM Plus Humanitarian Aid / Disaster Relief and Defense Medical College Exercise (AM-HEx2016) in Thailand from September 3 to 9 of the same year.

Beginning on 5 May 2017, Kunisaki performed joint training with the French Navy's  in the waters around Japan.

From 3 June to 21 August, the ship was under the command of the Mine Warfare Force commander during training with the U.S. military (Talisman Saber 19) at the Shoalwater Bay Exercise Area in Queensland, Australia and the surrounding waters. On 18 June, while participating in the training, she was towed by a tugboat and tried to turn around to leave Brisbane, Australia, but she collided with the quay of the port. The stern door broke, and the quay also broke.

Gallery

Citations

External links 

Ōsumi-class tank landing ships
Ships built by Hitachi Zosen Corporation
2001 ships